Big Deer State Park is a state park in Groton, Vermont. The park is a campground located in Groton State Forest close to the Groton Nature Center, Boulder Beach State Park and Stillwater State Park.

The park features 23 tent/RV sites and 5 lean-tos. There is a restroom with hot showers. A sanitary dump station is available at Stillwater, but no hookups.

References

External links
Official website

State parks of Vermont
Protected areas of Caledonia County, Vermont
Groton, Vermont